Fair division of a single homogeneous resource is one of the simplest settings in fair division problems. There is a single resource that should be divided between several people. The challenge is that each person derives a different utility from each amount of the resource. Hence, there are several conflicting principles for deciding how the resource should be divided. A primary conflict is between efficiency and equality. Efficiency is represented by the utilitarian rule, which maximizes the sum of utilities; equality is represented by the egalitarian rule, which maximizes the minimum utility.

Setting 
In a certain society, there are:
  units of some divisible resource.
  agents with different "utilities".

This setting can have various interpretations. For example:
 The resource is wood, the agents are builders, and the utility functions represent their productive power -  is the number of buildings that agent  can build using  units of wood. 
 The resource is a medication, the agents are patients, and the utility functions represent their chance of recovery -  is the probability of agent  to recover by getting  doses of the medication.

In any case, the society has to decide how to divide the resource among the agents: it has to find a vector  such that:

Allocation rules

Envy-free 
The Envy-freeness rule says that the resource should be allocated such that no agent envies another agent. In the case of a single homogeneous resource, it always selects the allocation that gives each agent the same amount of the resource, regardless of their utility function:

Utilitarian 
The utilitarian rule says that the sum of utilities should be maximized. Therefore, the utilitarian allocation is:

Egalitarian 
The egalitarian rule says that the utilities of all agents should be equal. Therefore, we would like to select an allocation that satisfies:

However, such allocation may not exist, since the ranges of the utility functions might not overlap (see example below). To ensure that a solution exists, we allow different utility levels, but require that agents with utility levels above the minimum receive no resources:

Equivalently, the egalitarian allocation maximizes the minimum utility:

The utilitarian and egalitarian rules may lead to the same allocation or to different allocations, depending on the utility functions. Some examples are illustrated below.

Examples

Common utility and unequal endowments 
Suppose all agents have the same utility function, but each agent  has a different initial endowment, . So the utility of each agent  is given by:

If  is a concave function, representing diminishing returns, then the utilitarian and egalitarian allocations are the same - trying to equalize the endowments of the agents.

In contrast, if  is a convex function, representing increasing returns, then the egalitarian allocation still pushes towards equality, but the utilitarian allocation now gives all the endowment to the richest agent: . This makes sense, for example, when the resource is a scarce medication: it may be socially best to give all medication to the patient with the highest chances of curing.

Constant utility ratios 
Suppose there is a common utility function , but each agent has a different coefficient  representing this agent's productivity. So the utility of each agent  is given by:

Here, the utilitarian and egalitarian approaches are diametrically opposed.

 The egalitarian allocation gives more resources to the less productive agents, in order to compensate them and let them reach a high utility level:

 The utilitarian allocation gives more resources to the more productive agents, since they will use the resources better:

Properties of allocation rules 
 Resource-monotonicity: the envy-free rule and the egalitarian rule are always resource-monotonic. The utilitarian rule is resource-monotonic when all utility functions are concave functions, representing diminishing returns; but, when some utility functions are convex functions, representing increasing returns, the utilitarian rule might be not resource-monotonic.

See also 
 Utilitarianism
 Egalitarianism

References 

Fair division